Bavayia ornata, also known as the ornate bavayia is a gecko endemic to mountain ranges of Grande Terre in New Caledonia.

References

Bavayia
Reptiles described in 1913
Taxa named by Jean Roux